Xiong County or Xiongxian is a county in the central part of Hebei province, China. It is the easternmost county-level division of the prefecture-level city of Baoding.

It is part of the Xiong'an New Area designated by national government in April 2017.

Administrative divisions

Towns:
Xiongzhou, Zangang, Daying

Townships:
Longwan Township, Zhugezhuang Township, Mijiawu Township, Shuangtang Township, Zhanggang Township, Beishakou Township

Climate

References

Geography of Baoding
County-level divisions of Hebei